Beta Monkey Music is a company, based in New Haven, Connecticut since 2002, that develops drum loops and drum samples for use in audio software and hardware. They are known for several product lines including the Drum Werks, Double Bass Mania, Jazz Essentials, Odd Time Meltdown, Rock Hard Funk, and Pure Country series of drum loops and drum samples. For use on Mac and Windows audio platforms, the soundware products are designed for use by songwriters and have been used worldwide since introduction in 2002.

Beta Monkey Music has been reviewed with acclaim by music magazines worldwide, including Electronic Musician, ReMix, Music Tech, Sound on Sound, and Recording Magazines.

Beta Monkey Music began with a simple philosophy: to offers musicians a viable alternative to high-priced sample libraries and to produce genre content not offered by the music sample industry. Beta Monkey quickly evolved and has developed over 50 drum sample libraries for multiple styles of music including rock, alt rock, heavy metal, blues, country, fusion, jazz, and world music. Beta Monkey Music has become one of the largest independent vendors of acoustic drum loop libraries and continues to develop and release drum samples and loops for musicians seeking an alternative to virtual and MIDI-based drum track products.

Products

 Drum Werks Series - Versatile drum loops for diverse styles of rock, hard rock, blues, reggae, and ska.
 Double Bass Mania Series - Powerful and aggressive metal drum loops and drum samples for all styles of metal music
 Jazz Essentials Series - Live, acoustic jazz drum tracks and drum loops
 Rock Hard Funk Series - Covering all classic and modern forms of funk music, this series of funk drum loops is 100% live and acoustic drum beats.
 Pure Country Series - An entire series of drum sample libraries devoted to traditional and modern country music songwriters.
 Odd Time Meltdown Series - Covering 3/4, 5/4, 5/8 7/4, 7/8 and 9/8 time signatures, the Odd Time Meltdown Series serves up the odd meters that will shake up your songwriting.

Published reviews
 MusicTech Magazine review of Beta Monkey Music Classic Backbeats II 
 MusicTech Magazine Review: 9/10 Stars for Double Bass Mania VIII
 Archive of all published reviews of Beta Monkey drum loops

External links
 Beta Monkey Drum Loops
 Beta Monkey Online Shop 
 Original Beta Monkey Music Website

References

 Beta Monkey Industry Reviews
 Sound on Sound Magazine Review
 Remix Magazine Review
 Electronic Musician Review
 Cakewalk.net Review
 Loop Insight Review

Companies based in New Haven, Connecticut
Music looping
Software samplers